Cape Verde produces a popular beer called Strela which is a Pale lager brewed by CERIS in the capital Praia on the island of Santiago. The beer is exported to Gambia, Guinea and Portugal.

See also

 Beer and breweries by region
 Beer in Africa

References

Beer in Africa
Food and drink in Cape Verde